The first season of the Australian version of the original NBC American reality television series The Biggest Loser premiered at 7pm each week night on Network Ten for 10 weeks from 13 February to 27 April 2006. The eventual winner, as decided by percentage of weight lost, was Adriano "Adro" Sarnelli, who won . The host was announced as Ajay Rochester, who had previously gone through weight loss herself. American trainers Bob Harper and Jillian Michaels reprised their roles from the previous American version. Applications closed on 11 November 2005 with over 6,000 Australians having applied to take part. The finale was watched by 2.310 million Australian viewers.

At the beginning of the season, all contestants were given one 'last meal' of their favourite meals such as steak, spaghetti, chocolates, lasagna, lollies, alcohol, and other items.

Season overview

Game variations
Final 4 at finale: Adro was invited back in a rather odd twist that was seemingly forced into the show after Bob and Jillian complained that it was "unfair" for Adro to be knocked out by Harry, because Harry was allowed to take vitamins in the time that he was out of the house while the contestants inside the house were not allowed to take vitamins.
Returning contestants: All contestants previously voted out were given the chance to compete against each other to be returned into the game. Tracy declined the opportunity to return and Wal gained weight meaning he had to leave the competition. Harry made the final spot and in turn knocked Adro out of the game with a vote from Kristie and Harry.
Super Challenge: The several eliminated contestants returned to the show to compete in a "Super Challenge" in which they trekked through 3 km of sand dunes to then make a choice of meals from a table of varied calorie meals. The contestant to choose the lowest three calorie meals would have a chance to be in the final 4. Harry completed the Super Challenge first, and chose the meal second lowest in calories (canned Roma Tomatoes). Jo was second to complete the challenge and chose the lowest calorie meal (Ribena Light), and although coming in last place, Cat chose the third lowest calorie meal (Tuna in Oil). A weigh in decided who was a part of the final 4; Cat lost 0.9 kg, Jo lost 2 kg, Harry lost 10.7 kg which was enough to award his place in the final
Teams: Contestants were initially divided into two teams of red and blue by their trainers Bob Harper and Jillian Michaels. The red team consisted of Adro, David, Jo, Kristie, Shane and Ruth and the blue team consisted of Cat, Artie, Harry, Fiona, Tracy and Wal.
Pairs: When only eight contestants remained, they were broken into pairs. Wal won the power to decide who would be paired together, which were Artie and Tracy, Fiona and Shane, Adro and Ruth, Wal and Kristie. After one week of pairs, contestants competed individually.
Final four: The final four contestants were Kristie, Fiona, Harry and Adro

Game elements

The Weigh-Ins
The following is a list of contestants and their weekly weight losses.

Contestants
  The week's biggest loser
  Had immunity for the week
  Weigh-in for previously eliminated contestants
  Winner (among finalists)
  Winner (among eliminated)

BMIs
  Healthy Body Mass Index (less than 25.0 BMI)
  Overweight Body Mass Index (25.0–29.9 BMI)
  Obese Class I (30.0–34.9 BMI)
  Obese Class II Index (35.0–39.9 BMI)
  Obese Class III (40.0 or above)

Elimination chronology
The order of elimination was: David, Jo, Cat, Harry, Tracey and Artie, Wal, Ruth, Shane, Adro (with Harry and Adro returning to be part of the final four contestants).

Finale
The finale was broadcast as a live contestant reunion on 27 April 2006, where the remaining four contestants were weighed to determine the first Australian Biggest Loser. Although commenting "I'm gonna win this", and losing 66.2 kg (37% of his body weight since his first weight-in), Harry lost out to Adro's marginally better 37.58%, who in total lost 51.3 kg. For Harry's efforts, he won $30,000. Third place went to Kristie, who lost 38.7 kg (36.93% - only 0.07% below Harry and within a percent Adro). She won a total of A$20,000. Coming in fourth was the lightest and youngest contestant, Fiona, who lost 29.5 kg (29.18%) and won A$10,000.

At the end of the show, Adro could only manage to yell, "this is unreal", as the stage was invaded by loved ones and eliminated contestants. As Wal shouted 'Young Bull' at the top of his voice and the crowd cheered. On the Sunday night following the finale, 30 April 2006, a special episode of the show aired to reveal Secrets of The Biggest Loser which includes all the diet and nutrition tips which were used as part of the show as well as a behind the scene look at the show itself.

All previously eliminated contestants were also weighed for the chance of the runners-up prize of A$50,000. Wal lost 66.3 kg (37.52%) of his original weight, making him the biggest loser of those eliminated. The remaining contestants achieved the following results:

Final 4

Eliminated contestants

Contestants

(In Order of Elimination)

Controversies
In the first week of the show, contestant Ruth thought she was pregnant and almost left the show. She tested negative and returned to the competition.
Trainer Bob Harper was absent for the second week of the show on season 1 after his mother suddenly died of a heart attack.
At one stage in the game, Kristie, having earned immunity, used water loading to gain 5.9 kg which meant she had a large loss of 8 kg the following week. The water loading technique was then officially banned with a new rule stating that gaining weight would result in being at risk of elimination even if immunity had been won. This had happened before when Shane and Fiona used the technique to lose big numbers the following week, having won immunity in a card playing "temptation".
After the contestants were reduced to a final three, one of the evicted guests was given an opportunity to re-enter the game. Jillian immediately voiced her opinion that it was unfair and pledged her allegiance to the previous final three. Harry was the contestant who won the right to return and he feuded with Jillian who was still not happy. After Adro was eliminated, Jillian and Bob successfully lobbied to get Adro back on the show citing Harry's "unfair" advantage of being allowed to use vitamins while he was out of the house.

Records
Kristie lost the most percentage of body weight in the first week of any show. In later shows, Shane, Fiona and Kristie were the only contestants to gain weight, Shane gaining  and Fiona gaining  - both "Water Loaded" so they could lose more weight the following week. Similarly, a contestant on US season 4 utilized the same strategy, water loading to gain  in one week and then losing  the following week, although unlike Kristie, he did not have immunity, and gained the weight not to lose extra the next week, but to sabotage another player.

Notes and references

External links
 Official Network Ten Site: The Biggest Loser (Australia)
 
Contestant pages
 Adro Sarnelli's Official Site, Adro Health (Winner)
 Kristie Dignam's Official Site (Finalist)
 Tracy Moores's Official Site
 Artie Rocke's Official Site
 David Hilyander's Official Site
 Cat White's Official Site

Australia (season 1)
2006 Australian television seasons